"Hungry for Heaven" is the seventh single released by heavy metal band Dio. It was the second single from their 1985 LP Sacred Heart, although it was originally written for the movie Vision Quest, appearing both in the film and on the associated soundtrack album.

Many different versions of the single exist; the original UK release had the B-side songs "King of Rock and Roll" and a live version of "Like the Beat of a Heart". An international version, however, had live versions of the songs "Holy Diver" and "Rainbow in the Dark" on the B-side, with a different sleeve design. The Australian release featured "The Last in Line" on the B-side, but this may have been a promotional release.

The single peaked at #30 on the Billboard Top Album Tracks chart.  A different version of this song also made an appearance in the 1985 movie Vision Quest.

The song's main guitar riff was heavily inspired by The Who's song "Baba O'Riley".

Chart performance

References 

1985 singles
Dio (band) songs
Songs written by Ronnie James Dio
Songs written by Jimmy Bain
1985 songs
Vertigo Records singles